The Guttenburg was a German brig of 170 tons that was wrecked on the Goodwin Sands on 1 January 1860, resulting in the death of 26 of the 31 people aboard.

Canton survivors
The Guttenburg picked up 14 survivors from the Canton, which she had found dis-masted and waterlogged off the coast of Newfoundland. The survivors were later delivered safely into the hands of the Walmer lugger Cosmopolite in a chance meeting off the coast of Dover.

Wreck
On 1 January 1860, the Guttenburg met with hurricane-force winds in thick fog and snow off the Goodwin Sands, which drove the brig onto the South Sand Head where it capsized during the storm. Distress signals were fired but were not seen by the harbor authorities because of the weather.

The Deal boatman Stephen Pritchard sent a telegram to Ramsgate harbor, asking for the lifeboat there to be launched. The lifeboat Northumberland, pulled by the Ramsgate steam tugboat Aid began to make a rescue attempt, but the boatmen and harbor tug men were prevented from leaving the harbor by the harbormaster, because he had not received the distress call by the proper means, and regulations had not been observed.

This delay resulted in the deaths of 26 passengers and crew (including the Deal pilot, Henry Pearson). The harbormaster was later charged with neglect, but retained his post.

Sources

Bayley, George B.; Adams, Williams (1929). Seamen of the Downs. Blackwood.

Tall ships of Germany
Passenger ships of Germany
Shipwrecks in the English Channel
1850s ships